Pitchblende was an American four-piece art punk band from Washington, D.C., United States, composed of Justin Chearno on guitar, Scott DeSimon on bass guitar, Patrick Gough on drums and Treiops Treyfid on guitar. 

Between 1991 and 1995, the group recorded three albums and several singles for the independent labels Cargo, Jade Tree, Matador Records and Simple Machines.

Style
Although based in Washington, Pitchblende's dense, angular sound was commonly thought to be closer in style to the contemporary music scenes in New York City and Chicago than what was heard on the DC-based post-punk labels at the time. Central to Pitchblende's approach was an emphasis on experimentation and dynamics; the band's songs often used complex structures, unusual arrangements, alternative tunings and jarring time changes.

Pitchblende's recordings and loud, energetic live shows earned them critical accolades and comparisons with influential bands such as Mission of Burma and Sonic Youth. The group melded together the chaotic spirit of punk with an absurdist, dada aesthetic; somewhat pop sensibilities; and a musical proficiency informed by prog-rock bands. In spite of occasional references to being inspired by jazz, very little of Pitchblende's music was improvisational. This misconception prompted the band to cheekily rename itself The Pitchblende Quartet for its final 1995 album, Gygax!.

Break up
Despite extensive touring and a prolific recorded output, Pitchblende remained largely a favorite of critics and college radio. After a disastrous final US tour in 1994 when the band's gear was stolen in San Francisco and DeSimon was attacked and beaten up in Albuquerque, Chearno and DeSimon moved to Brooklyn where they formed the three piece instrumental band Turing Machine with the late Jerry Fuchs. Chearno went on to form the bands Doldrums and Panthers. Today, Chearno works in the wine industry in New York. DeSimon is a magazine editor. Gough is an urban planner in Northern Virginia who played in the D.C.-based trio Imperial China from 2007 to 2013, and Treyfid is a Los Angeles-based fine artist, solo musician and graphic designer.

Discography

Singles and EPs
 "Sum"/"Lacquer Box" 7-inch, Landspeed - LS001, February 1992
 The Weed Slam EP 7-inch - "Weed Slam"/"Ask Rexella"/"Ursa Minor", Jade Tree - JT1008, October 1992
 Penny for the Guy Working Holiday split 7-inch (with Swirlies), Simple Machines - WH11, November 1993
 "Psychic Power Control"/"In the Flat Field" 7-inch, Cargo - Fist15, May 1994
 "Nine-Volt"/"Karoshi" 7-inch (alternative versions), Pushead Fan Club limited/signed run of 400, September 1994
 "Windshield Kiss" split 7-inch (with Eggs), Jade Tree - JT-16, November 1995

LPs
 Kill Atom Smasher CD/LP, Cargo - Fist12, April 1993
 Au Jus CD/CS, Cargo - Fist22, June 1994 - CD/LP, Matador (Europe) - Ole 102, April 1995
 Gygax! CD, Cargo - HED-048, February 1996 - Gygax! CD/LP, Matador (Europe) - Ole 190, April 1996

Appearances
 "Drop In the Big Drink" split 7-inch (with Rocket from the Crypt, Rodan, and Walleye), Compulsive - COMP12, October 1993
 Chairman of the Board - Frank Sinatra Tribute, double CD, "Here's to the Losers", Grass/Dutch East - GROW1212-2, Spring 1995
 Working Holiday! double CD, "Penny for the Guy" 7-inch version and a live recording of "Flax" at the Working Holiday Festival, January 1994, Simple Machines - SMR 26, December 1994
 WGNS Gots No Station compilation, "Sideling Hill" (alternate version), 1994
 Jade Tree First Five Years, "Windshield Kiss" 7-inch, 2000

References

External links
 Official website

Musical groups established in 1991
American art rock groups
Punk rock groups from Washington, D.C.
Jade Tree (record label) artists
1991 establishments in Washington, D.C.